Lake Village is a city in and the county seat of Chicot County, Arkansas, United States.  The population was 2,575 at the 2010 census. It is located in the Arkansas Delta. Lake Village is named for its location on Lake Chicot, an oxbow lake formed by the Mississippi River.

History
According to legend, the remains of Spanish explorer Hernando de Soto might be buried under Lake Chicot.  His expedition visited Guachoya, a native village along the edge of the lake, which is recorded as the site of his death (list of sites and peoples visited by the Hernando de Soto Expedition).

Lake Village was later founded at this location by European-American colonists. The area was developed for cotton plantations, and the county seat was the center of government and county trading. The antebellum years were when the county generated its greatest wealth, at least for planters.

Solo pilot Charles Lindbergh made his first nighttime flight in April 1923 over Lake Chicot and Lake Village.

Lake Village has nine properties listed on the National Register of Historic Places: Carlton House, Chicot County Courthouse, Sam Epstein House, Gregory Dipping Vat, Lake Village Confederate Monument, Lake Village Post Office, Dr. E.P. McGehee Infirmary, New Hope Missionary Baptist Church Cemetery (Historic Section), and the John Tushek Building. In addition, the Lake Village Commercial Historic District is listed, as is the nearby Lakeport Plantation. The antebellum mansion of the latter is the only one in the state that is located near the Mississippi River.

Geography
Lake Village is located north of the center of Chicot County at  (33.331592, -91.283497). It is situated on the west bank of Lake Chicot, a former course of the Mississippi River that is and now an oxbow lake.

U.S. Routes 65 and 82 pass through the city. US 65 leads north  to McGehee and south  to Eudora, while US 82 leads west  to Hamburg and east  to Greenville, Mississippi. U.S. Route 278 follows US 65 north out of town and US 82 east to Mississippi.

The city is located in the southernmost section of the Delta Lowlands of Arkansas and boasts beautiful scenic vistas of the Mississippi River.

Demographics

2020 census

As of the 2020 United States Census, there were 2,065 people, 960 households, and 552 families residing in the city.

2000 census
As of the census of 2000, there were 2,823 people, 1,090 households, and 705 families residing in the city. The racial makeup of the city was 56.15% Black or African American, 40.74% White, 0.21% Native American, 1.13% Asian, 0.57% from other races, and 1.20% from two or more races.  1.38% of the population were Hispanic or Latino of any race.

There were 1,090 households, out of which 33.9% had children under the age of 18 living with them, 36.6% were married couples living together, 24.2% had a female householder with no husband present, and 35.3% were non-families. 32.6% of all households were made up of individuals, and 15.1% had someone living alone who was 65 years of age or older.  The average household size was 2.49 and the average family size was 3.16.

In the city, the population was spread out, with 29.3% under the age of 18, 8.0% from 18 to 24, 25.5% from 25 to 44, 19.7% from 45 to 64, and 17.5% who were 65 years of age or older.  The median age was 36 years. For every 100 females, there were 79.9 males.  For every 100 females age 18 and over, there were 71.0 males.

The median income for a household in the city was $20,625, and the median income for a family was $28,438. Males had a median income of $37,031 versus $14,872 for females. The per capita income for the city was $12,677.  About 29.1% of families and 36.1% of the population were below the poverty line, including 49.6% of those under age 18 and 24.5% of those age 65 or over.

Economy
The economy of the area is based on agriculture. The crops grown are mainly cotton, soybeans and wheat. There is also a large aquacultural base, consisting mainly of catfish farmers. In addition, county government is an important employer as Lake Village is the county seat of Chicot County.

The state Tourist Information Center in Lake Village is located on a pier extending into Lake Chicot. It is the only tourist center in the state to be completely heated and cooled by solar energy. It is scheduled to be replaced by a more modern center.

Education
Public education is provided by Lakeside School District, which leads to graduation from Lakeside High School.

Transportation
In June 2008, construction was completed to convert the two-lane combined highway of 82, 65 and 278 inside of the city limits of Lake Village into a four-lane highway, with an added stoplight and sidewalks on both sides of the road. There has been no indication of whether plans for widening the highway further south to the Greenville Bridge over the Mississippi are still viable, or when construction might begin.

Notable people
Herm Bagby, American football player
Richard C. Caesar, Dentist, former U.S. Army Air Corps/U.S. Air Force officer/combat fighter pilot with the Tuskegee Airmen
Daniel Reynolds, Confederate Brigadier General
Leon "Pee Wee" Whittaker, American trombonist
George C. Shell, lawyer and state representative

References

External links
 City of Lake Village official website
 Lakeside School District
 Lakeport Plantation, official website 
 Delta News Online, official website

 
Cities in Chicot County, Arkansas
Cities in Arkansas
County seats in Arkansas